Astragalus clarianus (orth. var. A. claranus) is a rare species of milkvetch known by the common names Clara Hunt's milkvetch and Napa milkvetch. It is endemic to northern California where it is known from only four or five occurrences along the border between Sonoma and Napa Counties. It is a federally listed endangered species.

Description
This is an annual herb producing thin stems covered in tiny rough hairs. The small leaves are made up of a few pairs of oval-shaped leaflets. The inflorescence is a small cluster of two to seven flowers. It is tapered at both ends, hairy in texture, and it bears a sharp beak at one end. The plant was named for the California schoolteacher and amateur botanist Clara Adele Pike Blodgett Hunt.

Ecology
This rare plant faces several threats, including invasive species, urban development, the establishment of vineyards in its habitat, grazing, trampling, alterations in the water regime, recreation, and road and airport maintenance activities.

References

External links
Jepson Manual Treatment
FWS Endangered Species Profile
Photo gallery

clarianus
Endemic flora of California
NatureServe critically imperiled species